Elliott Tyrone Waller (born March 14, 1957) or more commonly known as Tye Waller or Ty Waller,  is a former Major League Baseball third baseman. He was also a coach for the Oakland Athletics from 2007 to 2015.

Playing career
Waller was drafted by the San Francisco Giants in the 33rd round of the 1975 Major League Baseball Draft, but did not sign. He was drafted by the St. Louis Cardinals in the 4th round of the 1977 January amateur draft, and signed in May.

After the 1980 season, St. Louis sent Waller to the Chicago Cubs as the player to be named later in an earlier trade that sent Leon Durham and Ken Reitz for Bruce Sutter. After the 1982 season, he was traded by the Cubs to the Chicago White Sox for Reggie Patterson. After the 1983 season, Waller signed with the Houston Astros as a free agent.

Personal
Tye also worked with the Padres for 19 years, as a Coach, Manager, Roving Instructor in Player Development.  Tye also became a baseball executive (Director of player Development 1999-2005).
His brother, Reggie Waller, became a baseball executive. Another brother, Kevin Waller, played in the minor leagues. His nephews, Gerric Waller and Derric Waller, played in the minor leagues as well.

External links

Tye Waller at Baseball Almanac
Tye Waller at Pura Pelota (Venezuelan Professional Baseball League)

1957 births
Living people
African-American baseball coaches
African-American baseball players
Arkansas Travelers players
Baseball players from California
Calgary Cardinals players
Cardenales de Lara players
American expatriate baseball players in Venezuela
Chicago Cubs players
Denver Bears players
Houston Astros players
Iowa Oaks players
Major League Baseball bench coaches
Major League Baseball first base coaches
Major League Baseball center fielders
Major League Baseball third basemen
Minor league baseball coaches
Minor league baseball managers
Oakland Athletics coaches
San Diego City Knights baseball players
San Diego Padres coaches
Spokane Indians managers
Sportspeople from Fresno, California
Springfield Redbirds players
St. Louis Cardinals players
St. Petersburg Cardinals players
Tucson Toros players
21st-century African-American people
20th-century African-American sportspeople